"War" is a song by Mastermind featuring Bandokay. It was released as a single in 2020 and peaked at number 39 on the UK Singles Chart.

Jack Lynch, writing for Complex Networks about the song, wrote:

Charts

References

2020 songs